Antón Paz Blanco (born 8 August 1976) is a Spanish sailor. With his partner Fernando Echavarri he won a gold medal at the 2008 Summer Olympics in Beijing. The two also competed at the 2004 Olympics in Athens, where they finished eighth. He is from the town of Vilagarcia de Arousa, Galicia, Spain.

He sailed the 2008–09 Volvo Ocean Race as the media crew member on board Telefónica Black.

References

External links
 
 
 

1976 births
Living people
Spanish male sailors (sport)
Sportspeople from Galicia (Spain)
Olympic sailors of Spain
Olympic gold medalists for Spain
Olympic medalists in sailing
Medalists at the 2008 Summer Olympics
Sailors at the 2004 Summer Olympics – Tornado
Sailors at the 2008 Summer Olympics – Tornado
ISAF World Sailor of the Year (male)
Tornado class world champions
Sportspeople from Vilagarcía de Arousa
Volvo Ocean Race sailors
World champions in sailing for Spain
21st-century Spanish people